The Sage Group plc, commonly known as Sage, is a British multinational enterprise software company based in Newcastle upon Tyne, England. As of 2017, it is the UK's second largest technology company, the world's third-largest supplier of enterprise resource planning software (behind Oracle and SAP), the largest supplier to small businesses, and has 6.1 million customers worldwide. It has offices in 23 countries. The company is a patron of the Sage Gateshead music venue in Gateshead.

Sage is listed on the London Stock Exchange and is a constituent of the FTSE 100 Index.

History

1981 to 2000
The Company was founded by David Goldman, Paul Muller, and Graham Wylie in 1981 in Newcastle upon Tyne, to develop estimating and accounting software for small businesses.

A student at Newcastle University, Graham Wylie, took a summer job with an accountancy firm funded by a government small business grant to write software to help their record keeping. This became the basis for Sage Line 50. Next, hired by David Goldman to write some estimating software for his printing company, Campbell Graphics, Graham used the same accounting software to produce the first version of Sage Accounts.  David was so impressed that he hired Graham and academic Paul Muller to form Sage, selling their software first to printing companies, and then to a wider market through a network of resellers.

In 1984, the Company launched Sage software, a product for the Amstrad PCW word processor, which used the CP/M operating system. Sage software sales escalated in that year from 30 copies a month to over 300. The Company was first listed on the London Stock Exchange in 1989.

In 1994, Paul Walker was appointed Chief Executive. In 1998, Sage's Professional Accountants Division was established. In 1999, Sage entered FTSE 100 and launched a dedicated Irish division, based in Dublin as well as its e-business strategy. In that same year the UK acquisition of Tetra saw Sage enter the mid-range business software market.

Sage was the best-performing UK share in the 1990s, increasing in value by 28,000%.

2000 to 2010

In 2001, Sage acquired Interact Commerce Inc. and entered the CRM/contact management market and in 2002 Sage won 'Business of The Year' in the National Business Awards. Also that year, Sage sponsored the new Music Centre in Gateshead for £6m – now known as Sage Gateshead – the largest ever UK arts/business sponsorship. Sage are one of two technology stocks listed on the FTSE 100 Index, the other being Micro Focus. In 2003, at age 43, Graham Wylie retired with 108.5 million shares in Sage worth £146m. He was rated Britain's 109th richest person in the 2002 Sunday Times Rich List.

Tony Hobson joined the Sage board of directors in June 2004 and became chairman in May 2007.

2010 to present
On 19 April 2010, Sage announced that its CEO, Paul Walker, had indicated an interest in stepping down from his position, which he had held for 16 years. The Financial Times reported that his departure would lead to speculation over Sage's mergers and acquisitions, which have been a key component to the group's growth in the past 20 years.

Walker was one of the longest serving CEOs of an FTSE100 company. Walker left the company on 1 December 2010.

On 1 October 2010 Guy Berruyer became CEO of Sage Group; Berruyer had previously been CEO of Sage's Mainland Europe & Asia operations.

On 15 February 2013, Sage announced that Accel-KKR intended to buy Sage Nonprofit Solutions, its division that produced software designed for nonprofit organisations and governmental agencies.

In August 2014, Sage announced that Guy Berruyer would retire. Stephen Kelly, the UK government's former chief operating officer, became Group CEO in November 2014. In September 2014 the company announced the acquisition of PayChoice for $157 million.

In March 2017, Sage Group acquired Compass, an analytics and benchmarking platform. In March 2017, Sage Group also acquired Fairsail, a Human Capital Management (HCM) cloud-based platform. In July 2017, Sage purchased Intacct for $850M.

On 31 August 2018, Sage announced that Stephen Kelly had stepped down as a director and CEO. On 2 November 2018, Steve Hare was appointed CEO. Hare had been Chief Financial Officer of Sage since 2014 and had been interim COO following the departure of the previous CEO.

In March 2020, Sage announced that it is offloading its Brazil operations to the president of the local business, Jorge Carneiro, in a deal estimated to be valued at  £1 million with an additional deferred consideration of up to £9 million.

Operations
Founded and headquartered in Newcastle upon Tyne, United Kingdom, the company has grown organically, through acquisitions and, more recently, through subscription services.

In June 1991, Sage Group moved into their first dedicated headquarters building, Sage House, in Benton, Newcastle upon Tyne, having previously been located in the Regent Centre office park. In 2004, the company completed their £50 million headquarters in the Great Park area of Newcastle upon Tyne. In 2021 Sage's Newcastle headquarters moved to Cobalt Park.

The company's US headquarters are in Atlanta, Georgia, the Canadian headquarters are in Richmond, British Columbia, the Africa, Middle East & Australia headquarters are in Johannesburg, South Africa and the French and Continental European headquarters are in Paris, France. Sage has 6.1 million customers and 13,400 employees across the world. Key industry focus includes: Healthcare; HR & Payroll; Construction/ Real-Estate; Transport/ Distribution; Payment Processing; Accountancy; Not-for-Profit; Manufacturing; Retail; Automotive Distribution.

Financial information

Financial results are as follows:

Sponsorships

The Sage Group is a patron of The Sage Gateshead, a Tyneside music venue designed by Sir Norman Foster. The Sage Gateshead was completed in 2004 at a cost of £70 million, and has since become a main sight on the River Tyne. It is primarily used as a concert venue and centre for musical education, but also hosts other events including conferences.

In 2008, Sage funded the revival of The Krypton Factor television series for ITV as a part of the Business Brain Training campaign. Sage were the football shirt sponsor in May 2011 for Whitley Bay F.C.'s FA Vase winning match. Sage had previously been a minor sponsor for Newcastle United F.C.

For the 2012 Formula One season, Sage were an official supplier for the Marussia F1 team, and for the 2013 and 2014 seasons Sage logos were placed on the car. For the 2017–18 Bristol City F.C. season, Sage has partnered with Bristol City F.C. as minor sponsor through their provision of Sage X3 for Bristol Sport.

Sage sponsored the Invictus Games in a multi-year partnership starting in 2016. Sage also sponsored the 2019 editions of the Reading Half Marathon and the Blaydon Race. Sage are an official partner of The Hundred cricket tournament.

Sage are sponsoring the 2023 Rugby World Cup, as well as the Six Nations Championship. Starting in the 2023 season Sage are an official partner of Major League Baseball organization. Additionally, opening 2024, Sage are the named sponsor of the new Newcastle Gateshead Quayside arena and conference centre, named "The Sage".

See also

 Comparison of accounting software
 Comparison of CRM systems
 List of ERP software packages

References

External links

 

 
Software companies of England
Customer relationship management software companies
ERP software companies
Human resource management software
Online payments
Companies based in Newcastle upon Tyne
Multinational companies headquartered in England
British companies established in 1981
Software companies established in 1981
1981 establishments in England
Companies listed on the London Stock Exchange
British brands
1980s initial public offerings